Rio Tinto, meaning "red river", may refer to:

Businesses 
 Rio Tinto (corporation), an Anglo-Australian multinational mining and resources corporation
 Rio Tinto Alcan, based in Canada
 Rio Tinto Borax in America
 Rio Tinto Borax Mine, a mine in Boron, California, USA
 Rio Tinto Coal Australia, the Australian coal mining operation
 Rio Tinto Energy America, an American operation
 Rio Tinto Madagascar, a Madagascar operation
 Rio Tinto Tower, a building in Brisbane, Queensland, Australia

Places

Brazil
 Rio Tinto, Paraíba

Portugal
 , a civil parish in the Esposende Municipality
 Rio Tinto (Gondomar), a civil parish in municipality of Gondomar

Spain
 Rio Tinto (river), a river descending from the Sierra Morena mountains of Andalusia, home of the first Rio Tinto Group mine.

United States
 Rio Tinto, Nevada

Other uses
 America First Field (formerly known as Rio Tinto Stadium), a soccer stadium, in Sandy, Utah, United States, home to the Major League Soccer club Real Salt Lake, named for its original sponsor Rio Tinto
 Rio Tinto espionage case, an accusation of bribery and espionage by employees of the Rio Tinto corporation in China
 SC Rio Tinto, a sports clube located in Rio Tinto, Portugal

See also
 Tinto River (Guayape), a river in Honduras
 Tinto (disambiguation)